Amity University, Raipur or Amity University Chhattisgarh is a private university located in Raipur, Chhattisgarh, India. It was established in 2014 by Ritnand Balved Education Foundation (RBEF) as its Chhattisgarh campus.

References

Educational institutions established in 2014
2014 establishments in Chhattisgarh
Universities in Chhattisgarh
Private universities in India
Education in Raipur, Chhattisgarh